"All Roads Lead to Rome" is a proverb of medieval origin that may refer to:

 A proverb in a number of languages referring to Roman roads, especially the Milliarium Aureum
 All Roads Lead to Rome (1949 film), a French film
 All Roads Lead to Rome (2015 film), an American romantic comedy film
 "All Roads Lead to Rome", an episode of the 2012 documentary Meet the Romans with Mary Beard
 "All Roads Lead to Rome", an episode of the 1965 Doctor Who serial The Romans
 "All Roads Lead to Rome", a song by The Stranglers on the 1983 album Feline